Kemi "Lala" Akindoju  is a Nigerian actress. She won an Africa Magic trailbrailzer award for her role in the film adaptation of Dazzling Mirage.

Personal life 
Akindoju was born on 8 March 1987 in a family of 4 children. She's a native of Ondo State. She had her secondary education at Queens College, Lagos. After obtaining her West African Examinations Council examination, She proceeded to study insurance at University of Lagos. She also received a master's degree from Pan-Atlantic University, studying media and communication. She married Chef Fregz in September 2018 and had a son in February 2021.

Career 
She started her acting career in 2005 from stage performance before venturing into feature films.

Filmography 
 Alan Poza (with OC Ukeje) 
 Dazzling Mirage
 The CEO
 Fifty
Suru L'ere
Òlòtūré
Potato Potahto
The Smart Money Woman
Lizard
Ada the Country

Awards and nominations 
The Future Awards - 2010 Actor of the year.
11th Africa Movie Academy Awards - Most Promising Actor
8th Africa Magic Viewers' Choice Awards - Best Television Series - The Smart Money Woman

References

External links
 

1987 births
21st-century Nigerian actresses
University of Lagos alumni
Actresses from Lagos State
Actresses from Ondo State
Living people
Yoruba actresses
Queen's College, Lagos alumni
Pan-Atlantic University alumni
Nigerian film actresses
AMVCA Trailblazer Award winners